The listed buildings in Huddersfield are arranged by wards as follows:

Listed buildings in Huddersfield (Ashbrow Ward)
Listed buildings in Huddersfield (Dalton Ward)
Listed buildings in Huddersfield (Greenhead Ward)
Listed buildings in Huddersfield (Lindley Ward)
Listed buildings in Huddersfield (Newsome Ward - central area)
Listed buildings in Huddersfield (Newsome Ward - outer areas)

Lists of listed buildings in Yorkshire